San Pietro di Cadore (Ladin: San Pieru) is a comune (municipality) in the Province of Belluno in the Italian region of Veneto, located about  north of Venice and about  northeast of Belluno, on the border with Austria.

San Pietro di Cadore borders the following municipalities: Obertilliach (Austria), San Nicolò di Comelico, Santo Stefano di Cadore, Untertilliach (Austria).

In November 2007, its mayor announced that the town was launching an initiative to collect signatures for a petition in favour of seceding from Italy to instead join Austria.

References